Skates! is a 1973 children's picture book by American author and illustrator Ezra Jack Keats.

Skates! is Keats's second, nearly wordless picture book, after Pssst! Doggie-, that features animals rather than people as characters. Young readers are encouraged to participate in the action in their own way by the humorous story and engaging illustrations.

American picture books
Books by Ezra Jack Keats
Dogs in literature
1973 children's books